Love in the Time of Civil War is a 2014 Canadian drama film directed by Rodrigue Jean. It was selected to be screened in the Contemporary World Cinema section at the 2014 Toronto International Film Festival. The film stars Alexandre Landry as Alex, a male hustler and drug addict in Montreal, Quebec.

Cast
 Ana Christina Alva
 Catherine-Audrey Lachapelle
 Alexandre Landry
 Jean-Simon Leduc as Bruno
 Éric Robidoux

References

External links
 

2014 films
2014 drama films
2014 LGBT-related films
Canadian drama films
Canadian LGBT-related films
Films directed by Rodrigue Jean
LGBT-related drama films
Films set in Montreal
Films about male prostitution in Canada
Gay-related films
French-language Canadian films
2010s Canadian films
2010s French-language films